Team SCA is a Volvo Ocean 65 yacht. She finished sixth in the 2014–15 Volvo Ocean Race skippered by Samantha Davies.

Following the race, the boat was refitted for the 2017–18 Volvo Ocean Race but did not compete.

The boat was renamed Ambersail II for the 2023 The Ocean Race.

2014-2015 Volvo Ocean Race
Team SCA rotated members for each leg of the race.

Crew
 Samantha Davies (Skipper)
 Libby Greenhalgh (Navigator)
 Abby Ehler
 Anna-Lena Elled Reserve Onboard Reporter
 Annie Lush
 Carolijn Brouwer
 Elodie-Jane Mettraux
 Justine Mettraux (Under 30)
 Liz Wardley
 Sally Barkow
 Sophie Ciszek (Under 30)
 Stacey Jackson
 Corinna Halloran (Onboard Reporter)
 Dee Caffari
 Sara Hastreiter
 Richard Mason (Shore manager)

Libby Greenhalgh won the B&G navigator prize, for best use of navigation equipment. This award is voted on by the other navigators in the race. The team finished third on the In-Port Series, winning leg 3 in Abu Dhabi and 5 in Auckland.

Results
Team SCA finished sixth in the overall standings and third in the in-port series.

Overall standings

In-port series

2023 The Ocean Race

Crew
The crew consisted of:
 Rokas Milevičius (skipper)
 Saulius Pajarskas (crew member)
 Wiktor Kobryń (crew member)
 Deimantė Jarmalavičiūtė (crew member)
 Anastasia Kolesnichenko (crew member)
 Martin Volkovicki (crew member)
 Jonas Drąsutavičius (crew member)
 Domantas Juškevičius (crew member)
 Sofiia Naumenko (crew member)
 Martynas Karpavičius (crew member)
 Sigitas Babilius (onboard reporter)

References

Volvo Ocean Race yachts
Volvo Ocean 65 yachts
Sailing yachts of Sweden
Fastnet Race yachts
2010s sailing yachts
Sailing yachts designed by Farr Yacht Design